The  is an electric multiple unit (EMU) commuter train type manufactured operated by the private railway operator Keihan Electric Railway on the Keihan Ishiyama Sakamoto Line in Japan since 1984.

Interior
Passenger accommodation consists of a longitudinal bench seating.

Formations
, the fleet consists of ten two-car sets (601 to 619), formed as follows.  All cars are motored.

Each car has one lozenge-type pantograph.

History
The first trains entered service in 1984.

Future developments
Between 2017 and March 2021, the entire fleet of 600 series trains is scheduled to be repainted in the standard corporate Keihan Electric Railway livery of "rest green" on the upper body and "atmos white" on the lower body separated by a "fresh green" stripe.

References

External links

  

Electric multiple units of Japan
600 series
Train-related introductions in 1984
1500 V DC multiple units of Japan